Mugg & Bean is a full-service, & On-The-Move restaurant, coffee-themed franchise restaurant chain originating from South Africa.  The restaurant chain was founded in 1996 by Ben Filmalter after a visit to a Chicago coffee shop in the early 1990s inspired him to open a similar restaurant in South Africa. The first restaurant was opened at the V&A Waterfront in Cape Town in 1996. The franchise was bought by Famous Brands in 2009.

As of 2015 they had 184 outlets throughout South Africa and the rest of Africa, as well as a number of overseas operations, including the United Arab Emirates and Kuwait.

Controversy 
In late 2018 and early 2019 Mugg & Bean was criticised by political parties and trade unions for alleged unfair labour practices.  Trade union COSATU threatened report the company to regulators for violating labour regulations relating to wages and working conditions.  In a separate incident the company was protested by the Economic Freedom Fighters political party when a restaurant manager was dismissed by a franchise owner amidst allegations of racism whilst the company stated that the manager was simply retrenched to cut costs.

See also
 List of restaurants in South Africa

References

External links
Official Website

Restaurant chains in South Africa
Restaurant franchises
Restaurants established in 1996
Coffeehouses and cafés in South Africa
Companies based in Johannesburg